The Treeing Cur is a breed of dog that originated in the mid-west of the United States. It was first recognized by United Kennel Club on November 1, 1998, due to the efforts of Alex and Ray Kovac. "Most Cur breeders were not well off and so they required a dog that could serve multiple purposes: hunter, guardian, and stock dog. The result was the Treeing Cur, which is the most varied in size and colors of the Cur breeds", according to United Kennel Club. They are primarily used to tree squirrels, raccoons, opossum, wild boar, bears, mountain lion, bobcat as well as to hunt big game.

Description
Treeing curs have no restrictions on color or markings like other registered coonhounds and scenthounds this allows breeders to breed for ability and not be restricted by color standards. There is also no proven link between color or markings to hunting or working ability.

Appearance
Treeing curs are medium-sized dogs known for their speed and agility in rough terrain. Their build is athletic and without major conformational faults. Their build and size can range greatly, because of the nature of the registration requirements of the treeing cur according to United Kennel Club "Most Cur breeders were not well off and so they required a dog that could serve multiple purposes: hunter, guardian, and stock dog. The result was the Treeing Cur, which is the most varied in size and colors of the Cur breeds." They are known for having a tail that is occasionally naturally bobbed but mostly artificially docked, Long tails are also acceptable. The ears should be natural and floppy, not erect. The dog should have a smooth athletic gait. The coat should be dense and close, and all colors except albinos are acceptable. The dog is built for stamina and should look like a working dog - in the United Kennel Club standard, scars are not penalized, nor used as a mark of a dog's working ability.

See also
 Dogs portal
 List of dog breeds
 Treeing Cur Dog History and Insight

References

External links

Curs
Dog breeds originating in the United States